Acestridium dichromum is a species of armored catfish in the genus Acestridium. It is native to the upper Orinoco and Negro basins.

References

Retzer, Michael E., Leo G. Nico and Francisco Provenzano R.: Two new species of Acestridium (Siluriformes: Loricariidae) from southern Venezuela, with observations on camouflage and color change. Ichthyological Exploration of Freshwaters, Volume 10(4)(1999)(p. 313)

External links
Globel Biodiversity Information Facility

Fish of South America
Hypoptopomatini
Taxa named by Michael Eugene Retzer